The Walrus is an independent, non-profit Canadian media organization. It is multi-platform and produces an 8-issue-per-year magazine and online editorial content that includes current affairs, fiction, poetry, and podcasts, a national speaker series called The Walrus Talks, and branded content for clients through The Walrus Lab.

History

Creation 
In 2002, David Berlin, a former editor and owner of the Literary Review of Canada, began promoting his vision of a world-class Canadian magazine. This led him to meet with then-Harper's editor Lewis H. Lapham to discuss creating a "Harper's North," which would combine the American magazine with 40 pages of Canadian content. As Berlin searched for funding to create that content, a mutual friend put him in touch with Ken Alexander, a former high school English and history teacher and then senior producer of CBC Newsworld's CounterSpin. Like Berlin, Alexander was hoping to found an intelligent Canadian magazine that dealt with world affairs.

Before long, the Chawkers Foundation, run by Alexander's family, had agreed to provide the prospective magazine with $5 million over five years, and the George Cedric Metcalf Charitable Foundation promised $150,000 for an internship program. This provided enough money to get by without the partnership with Harper's.

Shortly after Berlin and Alexander hired creative director Antonio de Luca and art director Jason Logan to envision the launch of The Walrus.

The magazine launched in September 2003, as an attempt to create a Canadian equivalent to American magazines such as Harper's, The Atlantic Monthly, or The New Yorker. Since then, it has become Canada's leading general interest magazine. Its mandate is
to be a national general interest magazine about Canada and its place in the world. We are committed to publishing the best work by the best writers from Canada and elsewhere on a wide range of topics for readers who are curious about the world.

Name 
The "walrus" name was at first a working title, but quickly grew on the staff of the magazine. According to their website, the rationale behind it was "to dissociate this country with the 'log chomping' and 'earnestness' of our national animal (and cliché), the beaver"; the walrus, just as much a Canadian native, is "curmudgeonly but clever, bulky but agile (if only in water)." Most importantly, in the words of David Berlin, "No one ignores a walrus."

Magazine 
Berlin resigned as editor in 2004, and Ken Alexander ended his tumultuous reign as publisher, then editor, in June 2008. John Macfarlane, former editor-in-chief of Toronto Life and publisher of Saturday Night, joined The Walrus in July 2008 as editor and co-publisher. With newly returned art director Brian Morgan, Macfarlane oversaw a revamping of the editorial and art direction of the magazine. The new Walrus was to be more consistent and current, with a "far more internally driven" process for story selection, and the reworked cover featuring illustrations that correspond to each issue's content.

The Walrus soon began to receive critical acclaim: its two 2003 issues alone garnered eleven National Magazine Award nominations and three wins, and the Utne Reader awarded it the prize for best new publication in 2004. In 2006, it won the National Magazine Award for Magazine of the Year in Canada. As of April 2017, it has consistently led in the National Magazine Awards, earning a total of 70 wins and 231 nominations to date.

In January 2012, High Fidelity HDTV and The Walrus announced plans to air fourteen "original high-definition documentaries" derived from content from The Walrus that had been produced since April 2011. The two companies plan on creating more documentaries in the future.

On September 13, 2012, the Walrus unveiled its redesigned website. It is based on the Wordpress platform and was developed over the course of five months.

Unpaid internship programme 
In March 2014, The Walrus was required to shut down its unpaid internship programme after the Ontario Ministry of Labour declared that its longstanding practice of not paying interns was in contravention of the Employment Standards Act. The magazine issued a statement justifying its practice of using unpaid labour, saying
We have been training future leaders in media and development for ten years, and we are extremely sorry we are no longer able to provide these opportunities, which have assisted many young Ontarians—and Canadians—in bridging the gap from university to paid work and in, many cases, on to stellar careers.
Since 2014, The Walrus has offered paid editorial fellowships that run six months.

Recent years 
On December 1, 2014, Jonathan Kay replaced John Macfarlane as Editor.

In October 2015, a report in Canadaland provided details of a toxic and disorganized environment at the magazine.

Kay resigned as editor on May 14, 2017, following a controversy around cultural appropriation in which he dismissed Indigenous concerns about the practice.

Jessica Johnson was named executive editor and creative director on September 7, 2017. As of September 2019, Johnson remained in that role, with Carmine Starnino as Deputy Editor, Viviane Fairbank as
Editor and Samia Madwar as Managing Editor.

Finances
Though The Walrus was initially pledged $1 million annually by the Chawkers Foundation for its first five years, it was unable to access this money without first being recognized as a charitable organization by the Canada Revenue Agency. The Alexander family was forced to support the magazine out of its own pocket until it finally received charitable status in 2005, creating the charitable non-profit Walrus Foundation. In addition to publishing the magazine, the Foundation runs events across Canada, including talks and debates on public policy.

In the relatively small and geographically dispersed Canadian market, magazines producing long-form journalism have often struggled to stay afloat. Saturday Night, which The Walrus editor John Macfarlane formerly published, lost money continuously despite being a celebrated publication. But as Macfarlane reports, The Walrus'''s charitable model, similar to that of Harper's'', is so far sustaining it: donations covered about half of the costs of producing the magazine in 2010, with the traditional revenue streams of circulation and advertising providing the rest. This is all the more important for the magazine because its educational mandate requires that it keep a ratio of no less than 70 percent editorial content to 30 percent advertising.

References

External links
 

Cultural magazines published in Canada
Magazines established in 2003
Magazines published in Toronto
2003 establishments in Ontario